is a former Japanese football player and manager. He played for Japan national team.

Club career
Honnami was born in Hirakata on June 23, 1964. After graduating from Osaka University of Commerce, he joined Japan Soccer League club Matsushita Electric (later Gamba Osaka) in 1986. The club won 1990 Emperor's Cup. In 1992, Japan Soccer League was folded and founded new league J1 League. Although he became a regular goalkeeper, he lost opportunity to play from 1996. He moved to Verdy Kawasaki (later Tokyo Verdy) in the middle of 1997 season. Although he was reserve goalkeeper behind Shinkichi Kikuchi, Honnami became a regular goalkeeper from 1999. He retired with his rival Kikuchi end of 2001 season.

International career
On May 29, 1994, Honnami debuted for Japan national team against France. He played 3 games for Japan in 1994.

Coaching career
In August 2012, Honnami became a manager for L.League club Speranza FC Osaka-Takatsuki (later Konomiya Speranza Osaka-Takatsuki). He resigned end of 2016 season.

Career statistics

Club

International

References

External links
 
 Japan National Football Team Database
 

1964 births
Living people
Osaka University of Commerce alumni
Association football people from Osaka Prefecture
Japanese footballers
Japan international footballers
Japan Soccer League players
J1 League players
Gamba Osaka players
Tokyo Verdy players
Japanese football managers
Association football goalkeepers
People from Hirakata